Melanie Liburd is a British actress known for her roles in This Is Us and Power Book II: Ghost.

In 2016, Liburd appeared as the red priestess in "No One", an episode of the sixth season of the HBO series Game of Thrones. She was cast in the Netflix psychological thriller television series Gypsy in late 2016.

From 2018 to 2019, Liburd portrayed Zoe in This Is Us. From 2020 to 2022, she portrayed Carrie Milgram in Power Book II: Ghost.

Filmography

References

External links

Living people
British television actresses
Place of birth missing (living people)
21st-century British actresses
1987 births
Black British actresses
British people of Barbadian descent